Dalibor Stojanović (born 4 April 1989, in Ljubljana) is a Slovenian football midfielder/striker, who plays for FAC Team für Wien.

Honors
Slovenian League: 2007–08

References

1989 births
Living people
Footballers from Ljubljana
Slovenian footballers
Association football midfielders
Association football forwards
NK Domžale players
Slovenian expatriate footballers
Expatriate footballers in Portugal
Slovenian PrvaLiga players
Slovenian expatriate sportspeople in Portugal
ND Gorica players
Expatriate footballers in Austria
Slovenian expatriate sportspeople in Austria
SKN St. Pölten players